Arbutus occidentalis or the Mexican Madrone is a small tree species in the heath family, that is endemic to Mexico. It is only known from a few areas in Western Mexico where it grows on rocky slopes. It produces red edible berries that are valuable food to  wildlife.

Distribution
The plant is found in montane Mexico from Chihuahua to Oaxaca.  It is found in pine forests, spreading on cliff summits and steep rocky slopes.

Description
Arbutus occidentalis is a low growing shrub, growing  in height. In places it forms colonies more than  ) wide.

The branches are covered with thin red bark. They have teeth along the edges.

Variations
Two regional variations of Arbutus occidentalis were formerly distinguished as varieties:
Arbutus occidentalis var. occidentalis  —almost smooth leaved, located in Central Mexico from Durango to Jalisco in the Sierra Madre Occidental.
Arbutus occidentalis var. villosa — leaves copiously covered beneath with wooly, villous hairs, located further south from Michoacan to Oaxaca in the Sierra Madre del Sur mountains.

References

occidentalis
Endemic flora of Mexico
Flora of Northwestern Mexico
Flora of Southwestern Mexico
Flora of the Sierra Madre Occidental
Flora of the Sierra Madre del Sur
Plants described in 1978